Highway 219 is a secondary highway in the Canadian province of Saskatchewan, running from the Gardiner Dam development and the north end of Lake Diefenbaker north to Saskatoon.

Route description
Highway 219 starts at Highway 44 near Cutbank and travels north, passing through the hamlet of Glenside, intersecting Highway 15 east of the town of Outlook, before passing through Whitecap Dakota First Nation. North of the First Nation, the highway passes through bedroom communities of Grasswood and Furdale before entering Saskatoon as Lorne Avenue. It intersects Circle Drive before ending at Idylwyld Drive.  

Lorne Avenue
Lorne Avenue is a road serving the city of Saskatoon, Saskatchewan, and functions as the division between the East and West addresses on the east side of the South Saskatchewan River. It begins as a continuation of Highway 219 to its intersections of Circle Drive and Idylwyld Drive. North of Adelaide Street, a roadway that connects with northbound Idylwyld Drive, Lorne Avenue downgrades to a collector road, where heavy trucks are prohibited, through the residential neighbourhood of Buena Vista (with some small retail development). North of the intersection of 8th Street, Lorne Avenue rejoins Idylwyld Drive south of the Senator Sid Buckwold Bridge. 

In the mid-2000s, the Government of Canada agreed to contribute $20 million for two new interchanges in Saskatoon, one of them being at the SK Hwy 219 / Lorne Ave intersection with Circle Drive.  This is part of the Asia-Pacific Gateway and Corridor Initiative to improve access to the Canadian National Railway's intermodal freight terminal thereby increasing Asia-Pacific trade. The interchange, part of the final phase of the Circle Drive South extension, was completed in 2013.

Major intersections
From south to north:

References

219
Streets in Saskatoon